The Hastings-Locke Ferry, on the Tennessee River near Decatur, Tennessee, was listed on the National Register of Historic Places in 1983.  It has also been known as Washington Ferry.  It is located east of Dayton, Tennessee on Tennessee State Route 30.

The listing included two landings, the c.1940 boat/barge which can transport six cars, and the waterway across the river.  The ferry was established around 1807 by Conley Hastings. The ferry was operated by the Locke family from about 1820. Solomon Henry and Sons operated the ferry through the 1870s and 1880s.  It was once one of many ferries across the Tennessee River and tributaries, but in 1982 it was one of only five ferries still in operation in Tennessee.

References

Ferries
National Register of Historic Places in Meigs County, Tennessee
National Register of Historic Places in Rhea County, Tennessee